West Haven, Connecticut is a city in the United States.

West Haven or Westhaven may also refer to:

 Westhaven, California (disambiguation)
 West Haven, Oregon, United States
 West Haven, Utah, United States
 West Haven, Vermont, United States
 Westhaven Nunatak, Antarctica

See also 
 Haven (disambiguation)
 New Haven (disambiguation)
 East Haven (disambiguation)
 North Haven (disambiguation)
 South Haven (disambiguation)
 Westhaven Marina, Auckland, New Zealand